Anja Heidi Thauer (3 July 194518 October 1973) was a German cellist.

Biography
Born in Lübeck, Thauer had her first music lessons in the town of Braunschweig.  The family subsequently moved to Erlangen.  Her parents, particularly her mother, Ruth Thauer (née Meister), recognised that she had an above-average musical talent at an early age.  Thauer played violin and cello duets with her mother in public at age 12.  She made her debut with the Baden-Baden orchestra at age 13 playing the Boccherini-Grützmacher B-flat cello concerto.  In due course, Thauer attended the conservatory in Nuremberg.

At age 14, Thauer was accepted into the master class of Professor Ludwig Hoelscher.  At age 15, she studied with André Navarra at the Paris Conservatory, and in parallel, she studied painting, philosophy and other literature courses at the École normale supérieure.  Thanks to her adoptive father's senior position at Siemens, Thauer lived with her mother in Paris when she was 15 years old.  During her studies in Paris, Thauer developed a notable professional musical partnership with Claude Françaix, the daughter of Jean Françaix, and the two performed his Fantasies. At age 16, she won an international music competition in Paris.  She received a four-year stipend from the French state.  The next year, 1962, she was awarded the "Grand Prix with distinction" in the final exam among 22 candidates, and subsequently left the Conservatory.  Thauer continued studying with Navarra for a year and received her diploma in 1963.

In 1964, she was awarded the Nuremberg Prize.  She toured widely throughout England, Europe, Scandinavia and the Far East, but never performed in North America.

Thauer performed radio concerts at Radio Bremen, at the SWR with the Stuttgart Radio Symphony Orchestra, and at the NDR with the Hanover Radio Orchestra.  She recorded commercially for Deutsche Grammophon, including the Cello Concerto of Dvořák with the Czech Philharmonic Orchestra conducted by Zdeněk Mácal, and chamber works of Max Reger and Jean Françaix with Jean Françaix as the pianist.

Later, Thauer became involved in a relationship with a married doctor in Wiesbaden.  The relationship was broken off and, on 18 October 1973, Thauer committed suicide in her home in Germany.  Five days later, the doctor also committed suicide.

Recordings
 Antonín Dvořák: Concerto for Violoncello and Orchestra in B minor, op. 104 - Deutsche Grammophon
 Max Reger: Suite No. 3 - Deutsche Grammophon
 Jean Françaix: Fantasie, with Jean Françaix, piano - Deutsche Grammophon
 Eugen d'Albert: Cello Concerto in C major - Attaca 4/6413
 Franz Schubert: Arpeggione Sonata in a minor - Attaca 4/6413
 Jean Françaix: Movement perpetuel - Attaca 4/6413

References

External links
 Eloquence Classics page on Deutsche Grammophon 4822181
 Tamino Klassikforum discussion page on Anja Thauer
 Capriccio Kulturforum discussion page on Anja Thauer

1945 births
1973 suicides
German women classical cellists
Musicians from Lübeck
Conservatoire de Paris alumni
20th-century classical musicians
1973 deaths
Suicides in Germany
20th-century cellists